Eupholidoptera is a genus of bush crickets belonging to the subfamily Tettigoniinae.

Distribution
Species belonging to this genus are present in Europe and in the Near East.

Species

References

 Orthoptera Species File
 Mařan, 1953 : Contribution to the knowledge of the genus Pholidoptera Wesm. Acta Entomologica Musei Nationalis Pragae, vol. 28.
 Ramme, 1950 : Zur Systema-tik, Faunistik und Biologie der Orthopteren von Siidost-Europa und Vorderasien. Mitteilungen aus dem Zoologischen Museum in Berlin, vol. 27
 Ciplak B., K.-G. Heller, F. Willemse (2009) - Review of the genus Eupholidoptera (Orthoptera, Tettigoniidae): different genitalia, uniform song Zootaxa 2156: 1–75

Tettigoniinae
Tettigoniidae genera